Daju is a township in Yulong Naxi Autonomous County, Lijiang Prefecture, Yunnan province, China.

It is located just above the eastern end of Tiger Leaping Gorge to the south of the Yangtse River.

External links
Historic photo taken by Charles Patrick Fitzgerald in 1937, looking down from Daju northward along the continuation of the Yangtse River. 

Township-level divisions of Lijiang